Eupholidoptera megastyla or Greek marbled bush-cricket is a species of 'katydids crickets' belonging to the family Tettigoniidae subfamily Tettigoniinae.

Distribution and habitat
The Greek marbled bush-cricket is endemic to Greece, where it is widespread across the mainland including the Peloponnesus, Ionian and western Aegean islands. They can be encountered in and around bushes and shrubs, from sea level up to high altitudes in the mountains.

Diet and Feeding Habits 
Eupholidoptera Megastyla has been observed to consume fruit, specifically overripe mulberries. This dietary preference aligns with the general eating habits of katydids, which are omnivorous and versatile feeders. They consume a variety of food sources, such as leaves, fruits, seeds, floral components, carrion, and live prey. Their diet may also include insect eggs and embryos of certain terrestrial frogs.

References

External links
 IUCN Red List

Tettigoniinae
Fauna of Greece
Insects described in 1939